Paracobitis phongthoensis is a species of stone loach found in Vietnam.

References

phongthoensis
Fish of Asia
Fish of Vietnam
Taxa named by Nguyễn Văn Hảo
Fish described in 2005